Time Together is a jazz vocal album released in 2011 by Michael Franks with Shanachie Records. It is Franks' seventeenth album and marked a departure from his previous recordings by being his first with an independent record label.

Track listing

Reception

Writing for the Urban Music Scene website, A. Scott Galloway ended his review by commenting "[f]ile under highly recommended... and sublime."

Comparing the album to Franks' other recent works such as Rendezvous in Rio, Thom Jurek commented on AllMusic that "[w]hile his framework may be contemporary, his execution is timeless, making Time Together Franks' most consistent, graceful collection of songs in the 21st century."

John Beaudin praised Now That the Summer's Here on SmoothJazzNow.com, claiming it to be "one of his strongest tunes in twenty years" and that "it's not everyday that someone's art shows so much peace and a transparent look at such an interesting perspective of life."

References

Bibliography

External links
'Time Together' Michael Franks interview on NPR (audio)

Michael Franks (musician) albums
2011 albums
Shanachie Records albums